Sir Mervyn Edward Manningham-Buller, 3rd Baronet (16 January 1876 – 22 August 1956) was a British Conservative politician and Member of Parliament (MP).

Family
His parents were Major-General Edmund Manningham-Buller and Lady Anne Coke. He married Lilah Constance Cavendish, daughter of Major-General Charles Cavendish, 3rd Baron Chesham and Lady Beatrice Constance Grosvenor, on 8 July 1903. Their children included Reginald Manningham-Buller, Attorney-General.

Military career

Mannigham-Buller was commissioned a second lieutenant in The Rifle Brigade on 9 October 1895, and was promoted to lieutenant on 25 May 1898, and to captain on 18 March 1901. He was seconded to the Imperial Yeomanry for service in the Second Boer War (1899–1901), and was 2nd in command of the 21st Battalion until he relinquished this appointment on 12 March 1902, when he returned to his regiment. Following the end of hostilities in South Africa, he return to the United Kingdom in August 1902, and resigned from the army in January 1903. He later received the rank of lieutenant-colonel.

Political career

Between 1924 and 1929 he was Conservative Member of Parliament for Kettering. In 1931 he was elected MP for Northampton; he resigned in 1940 upon becoming Steward of the Manor of Northstead.

Death
Mervyn Manningham-Buller died in Chelsea, London, aged 80.

References

External links 
 

1876 births
1956 deaths
Conservative Party (UK) MPs for English constituencies
UK MPs 1924–1929
UK MPs 1931–1935
UK MPs 1935–1945
Rifle Brigade officers
People educated at Eton College
Graduates of the Royal Military College, Sandhurst
British Army personnel of the Second Boer War
British Army personnel of World War I
Baronets in the Baronetage of the United Kingdom
Meryn